Nicetas I (or Niketas; Greek: Νικήτας), (? – 7 February 780) was the Ecumenical Patriarch of Constantinople from 766 to 780. He was of Slavic ancestry and he was a eunuch.

He was chosen by the Emperor Constantine V as a successor of the Patriarch Constantine II of Constantinople. However, Nicetas was quite unpopular in Constantinople because he was a supporter of iconoclasm. After his death in 780, Nicetas was declared a heretic. He was succeeded by Paul IV of Constantinople.

References 

780 deaths
8th-century patriarchs of Constantinople
Byzantine Iconoclasm
Byzantine eunuchs
Year of birth unknown
Byzantine people of Slavic descent